Isabelle Demongeot (born 18 September 1966) is a former professional tennis player from France, who turned professional on 1 May 1983.  She lived in Saint-Tropez in the French Riviera in the early stages of her career and later settled further south in Gassin.

Demongeot won her only WTA Tour singles title in Purchase in New York state in 1991. She achieved her best Grand Slam singles performance by reaching the fourth round of Wimbledon in 1986. She won a total of nine WTA Tour doubles titles. Her best Grand Slam doubles performance was reaching the French Open quarter-finals with Nathalie Tauziat of France in 1987 and 1992. She also represented her country from 1985 to 1993 in the Federation/Fed Cup and in the 1988 and 1992 Olympic Games. She retired from the WTA Tour in 1996.

In her 2007 book, Service volé, she accused her coach, Régis de Camaret, of rape and sexual abuse. She would later be joined by several former pupils who confirmed the allegations. In 2012, the coach, aged 70, was sentenced to 8 years in prison.

WTA Tour finals

Singles 1 (1–0)

Doubles 13 (9–4)

ITF finals

Singles (4-4)

Doubles (4-4)

References

External links
 
 
 

1966 births
Living people
French female tennis players
Olympic tennis players of France
Sportspeople from Var (department)
Tennis players at the 1988 Summer Olympics
Tennis players at the 1992 Summer Olympics
Knights of the Ordre national du Mérite